Allocasuarina luehmannii (buloke or bull-oak) is a species of ironwood tree native to Australia and its wood
is the hardest commercially available as measured by the Janka Hardness Scale.

Description 

It is moderately to long-lived, usually over 15 years with a moderate growth rate. It is dioecious with male and female flowers on separate plants, which flowers in spring. 
It is cited as having the hardest wood in the world, with a Janka hardness of 22,500 N (5,060 lbf). However, The Wood Database gives it a Janka hardness of only 16,600 N (3,760 lbf):"Australian buloke is commonly reported as the hardest wood in the world. This is based upon a single data source and may not give the best representation of all testing and data available. Consequently, with as many data points taken into consideration as possible, Australian buloke ranks at #21 overall on the poster Worldwide Woods, Ranked by Hardness. They are sometimes waxy, of slightly greater diameter near their apex than their base.

Distribution
The species occurs across a vast region of eastern and southern Australia, mainly north and west of the Great Dividing Range, within the Murray-Darling Basin, and within the states of New South Wales, South Australia and Victoria. Its extent of occurrence has been greatly depleted by clearing for cereal cropping and pasture development. It is an important food resource for the endangered southeastern subspecies of the red-tailed black cockatoo in the Wimmera region of western Victoria, where some remnant stands are threatened by farming practices  It grows on a range of soil types, mainly sandy loams, and is usually found on lower parts of the landscape. It tolerates acid, alkaline and moderately saline soils.

The Shire of Buloke in Victoria, Australia is named after this tree species.

Classification and naming
The species was first formally described as Casuarina luehmannii in 1900 by the botanist Richard Thomas Baker in the paper On two new species of Casuarina in the Proceedings of the Linnean Society of New South Wales. It was subsequently reclassified in the Allocasuarina genus by Lawrence Alexander Sidney Johnson in 1985 in the Journal of the Adelaide Botanic Gardens.

The Wiradjuri people of New South Wales use the name Ngany to refer to the species.

Aboriginal uses
The Wiradjuri people of NSW use the timber and resinous sap to make a range of tools and other implements, including weapons such as boomerangs and clubs. Wiradjuri people also value the species due to its ability to attract many animals that are food sources, such as possums and birds.

Gallery

References

External links
  Occurrence data for Allocasuarina luehmannii from The Australasian Virtual Herbarium

luehmannii
Fagales of Australia
Flora of New South Wales
Flora of South Australia
Flora of Victoria (Australia)
Trees of Australia
Drought-tolerant trees
Dioecious plants